The Ten Mile Creek Bridge was a historic structure located northwest of Decorah, Iowa, United States. The R.D. Wheaton Bridge Company of Chicago supplied several king post truss bridges to Winneshiek County in the mid-1890s, and this is probably one of them. There are no county records specific to this bridge. It was listed on the National Register of Historic Places in 1998 and it was delisted in 2017.

References

Bridges completed in 1895
Bridges in Winneshiek County, Iowa
National Register of Historic Places in Winneshiek County, Iowa
Road bridges on the National Register of Historic Places in Iowa
Truss bridges in Iowa
Former National Register of Historic Places in Iowa